Empress Njamah is a Nigerian actress. In 2012, she was nominated for best-supporting actress at the Africa Movie Academy Awards  but lost out to Terry Pheto.

Personal life 
Njamah's parents are of Nigerian and Cameroonian origins. She is a graduate of English from Olabisi Onabanjo University, Ogun State. She once dated Timaya, but the relationship ended after becoming a subject of discussion on social media. Commenting on her marital status, she explained that she is not bothered by remaining single since her family is enlightened and understands that the ratio of women to men is uneven. She went further to explain that celebrity marriages do not last and there isn't any point in wasting funds for a wedding that will not stand the test of time. On the prevalence of "baby mama's" in Nollywood, she explained to The Punch that most single actresses with children regret their steps but are not bold enough to say that in public. She is a close friend to her colleague Ada Ameh in the  film industry.

Career 
She started acting in 1995. As part of her corporate social responsibility, she launched a foundation called House of Empress, which caters to kids with special needs. The foundation celebrated its 10th anniversary in 2016.

Filmography 

The Pastor and the Harlot
You Broke My Heart

References

External links 
 

20th-century Nigerian actresses
21st-century Nigerian actresses
Nigerian film actresses
Living people
Olabisi Onabanjo University alumni
1969 births